is a city located in Nagasaki Prefecture, Japan. As of March 2017, the city has an estimated population of 28,815 and a population density of 4,700 persons per km2. The total area is 242.01 km2.

The modern city of Saikai was established on April 1, 2005, from the merger of five towns on the northern tip of Nishisonogi Peninsula: the former town of Saikai, Ōseto, Ōshima, Sakito and Seihi (all from Nishisonogi District). Its city hall is the former town hall of Ōseto.

The economy of the towns in this area were dominated by fishing and whaling in the Edo period, and coal mining in the Meiji period. The area is now primarily agricultural, with forestry products and tourism also of importance.

However, on Oshima island, north of Saikai and close to Sasebo, a large shipyard is active building bulk ships and metal structures, i.e. Oshima Shipbuilding, in which the Sumitomo Heavy Industries has shares.

Geography

Climate
Saikai has a humid subtropical climate (Köppen:Cfa) with hot summers and cool winters.

Demographics
Per Japanese census data, the population of Saikai in 2020 is 26,275 people. Saikai has been conducting censuses since 1920. The city's population peaked in the 1950s with more than 80,000 people. However, since 1960, Saikai's population has fallen sharply, and in the 1970s it was half what it was 10 years ago; by 2020, the population will be only a third of what it was in the 1950s.

References

External links

 Saikai City official website 

Cities in Nagasaki Prefecture